

137001–137100 

|-id=039
| 137039 Lisiguang ||  || Li Siguang (1899–1971), founder of and pioneer in modern Chinese geology || 
|-id=052
| 137052 Tjelvar ||  || Tjelvar, first inhabitant on Gotland || 
|-id=066
| 137066 Gellért-hegy ||  || Gellért-hegy, a 235-meter high hill on the shore of the Danube in Budapest, Hungary || 
|-id=082
| 137082 Maurobachini ||  || Mauro Bachini (born 1959), an amateur astronomer who works at the Astronomical Observatory of Tavolaia, Santa Maria a Monte. || 
|}

137101–137200 

|-id=165
| 137165 Annis ||  || Jim Annis (born 1961), American astronomer || 
|-id=166
| 137166 Netabahcall ||  || Neta Bahcall (born 1942), Israeli-American cosmologist || 
|}

137201–137300 

|-id=217
| 137217 Racah ||  || Giulio Racah (1909–1965), founder of physics in Israel || 
|}

137301–137400 

|-bgcolor=#f2f2f2
| colspan=4 align=center | 
|}

137401–137500 

|-bgcolor=#f2f2f2
| colspan=4 align=center | 
|}

137501–137600 

|-bgcolor=#f2f2f2
| colspan=4 align=center | 
|}

137601–137700 

|-id=632
| 137632 Ramsauer ||  || Alfred Ramsauer (born 1928) has been a member of the Linzer Astronomische Gemeinschaft since 1952. || 
|}

137701–137800 

|-bgcolor=#f2f2f2
| colspan=4 align=center | 
|}

137801–137900 

|-bgcolor=#f2f2f2
| colspan=4 align=center | 
|}

137901–138000 

|-bgcolor=#f2f2f2
| colspan=4 align=center | 
|}

References 

137001-138000